The International Olympiad on Astronomy and Astrophysics (IOAA) is an annual Astronomy and Astrophysics competition for high school students. It is one of the international science olympiads.

The Olympiad was founded from a dissidence inside the International Astronomy Olympiad, in order to increase the scope of the organization.

The first IOAA was held in Chiang Mai, Thailand, in November/December 2007.

History 
The first Olympiad was held in the city of Chiang Mai (Thailand) from November 30 to December 9, 2007. The International Council, consisting of team leaders, elected a president (Dr. Boonrucksar Soonthornthum, Thailand) and a secretary general (Dr. Chatief Kunjaya, Indonesia) for a five-year term.

The second Olympiad was held in 2008, from August 19 to 28, in the city of Bandung (Indonesia). It was attended by representatives of 22 countries.

The third Olympiad was held in 2009, from October 17 to 27, in Tehran. An observation tour was conducted in the desert. Representatives of 20 countries took part in the Olympiad.

The fourth Olympiad was held in 2010, from September 12 to September 21, in Beijing. 114 participants of the Olympiad came from 23 countries.

The fifth Olympiad was held in 2011, from August 25 to September 4, in the Polish cities of Katowice, Chorzow and Krakow. For the first time the Olympiad was held in Europe. Representatives of 26 countries took part in the Olympiad. In Poland, the International Council elected a new president (Dr. Chatief Kunjaya, Indonesia) and a secretary general (Dr. Greg Stachowski, Poland). Regional coordinators were also elected (Dr. Thaís Mothé Diniz, Brazil, for America and Dr. Aniket Sule, India, for Asia).

The sixth Olympiad was held in 2012, from August 4 to 13. For the first time the Olympiad was held in America in the Brazilian cities of Rio de Janeiro and Vasoras. Representatives of 28 countries took part in the Olympiad.

The seventh Olympiad was held in 2013, from July 27 to August 4 in the Greek city of Volos. The competition was attended by 39 teams from 35 countries, including for the first time teams from the USA, New Zealand, Canada, Malaysia, Armenia, the Republic of Macedonia and Cyprus.

The fourteenth Olympiad was supposed to be held in Bogota, Colombia. However, due to the COVID-19 pandemic, the competition was moved to an online format and Colombia was moved to 2021. This competition was not named IOAA, but GeCAA (meaning Global e-Competition on Astronomy and Astrophysics) and did not count as the 14th IOAA. It was held 23rd September 2020 to 23rd October 2020. Estonia was the host country.

Summary 

Next Latin American Astronomy and Astrophysics Olympiad will be held in Panama. https://olaapanama2022.com/

1st IOAA-Jr, for the students under 16 years of age was held in Romania from 30th October to 7th November 2022.

Participating Countries
Source: https://www.ioaastrophysics.org/participating-countries/

Results
Source: https://www.ioaastrophysics.org/results/

Prizewinners

High-scoring participants 
The following table lists multiple (triple and more) gold medal winners of IOAA with their ranks and corresponding years.

Note: Several countries (e.g. India, Indonesia, Iran, Thailand) do not allow their students to contest in IOAA more than two times, even if they are eligible. Thus, statistics from those countries is not included in the table above.

References 

https://www.ioaastrophysics.org/history-2/

https://www.ioaastrophysics.org/national-olympiad-pages/

https://www.ioaastrophysics.org/gecaa/

https://www.ioaastrophysics.org/

https://www.ioaastrophysics.org/solutions/

Astronomy competitions
International Science Olympiad